Sultan bin Saeed Al Mansoori is an Emirati engineer who was the Minister of the Economy of the United Arab Emirates from 2008 until 2020.

Biography 

Sultan bin Saeed Al Mansoori holds a bachelor's degree in industrial engineering and management systems from Arizona State University.

Sultan bin Saeed Al Mansoori was Minister of Communication (...-2004), Minister of Transport and Communication (2004-2006), and Minister of Governmental Sector Development (2006-2008).

Sultan bin Saeed Al Mansoori was appointed Minister of the Economy in a cabinet reshuffle on 17 February 2008. Part of his program as Minister is to reduce the country's dependence on oil revenues. In March 2015, the Ministry of Economy allowed full ownership of foreign companies in the country's free zones. In November 2018, he laid out his strategy to strengthen ties between the UAE and Latin American countries, while maintaining a strong bilateral trade strategy with China.

By virtue of his ministership, he is also the Chairman of UAE's General Civil Aviation Authority.

See also 
 Economy of the United Arab Emirates
 UAE vision 2021

References

External links 

 Official biography

Living people
Ira A. Fulton Schools of Engineering alumni
Emirati industrial engineers
Emirati politicians
Economy ministers of the United Arab Emirates
Transport ministers of the United Arab Emirates
Communication ministers of the United Arab Emirates
Year of birth missing (living people)